Ward Hall may refer to:

Ward Hall (Georgetown, Kentucky), listed on the National Register of Historic Places (NRHP)
Ward Hall (Ward, South Dakota), listed on the National Register of Historic Places in Moody County
Ward Memorial Hall, Wood, Wisconsin, NRHP-listed

See also
Ward Hill (disambiguation)
Ward House (disambiguation)

Architectural disambiguation pages